Vosketap is a village in the Vedi Municipality of the Ararat Province of Armenia. The town's local Azerbaijanis moved following the outbreak of the Nagorno-Karabakh conflict. In 1988-1989 Armenian refugees from Azerbaijan settled in the village.

References

External links 

World Gazeteer: Armenia – World-Gazetteer.com

Populated places in Ararat Province